The Roman Catholic Diocese of San Cristóbal de Venezuela is a diocese located in the city of San Cristóbal in the ecclesiastical province of Mérida in Venezuela.

History
On 12 October 1922 Pope Pius XI established the Diocese of San Cristóbal de Venezuela from the Diocese of Mérida.

Special churches
Minor Basilicas:
Basílica de Nuestra Señora de la Consolación, Táriba
Basílica del Espíritu Santo, La Grita

Bishops

Ordinaries
Tomás Antonio Sanmiguel Díaz (22 June 1923 – 6 July 1937)
Rafael Ignacio Arias Blanco (12 November 1939 – 23 April 1952) Appointed, Coadjutor Archbishop of Caracas
Alejandro Fernández Feo-Tinico (23 April 1952 – 26 October 1984)
Marco Tulio Ramírez Roa (26 October 1984 – 26 February 1998)
Mario del Valle Moronta Rodríguez (14 April 1999 – present)

Auxiliary Bishop
Juan Alberto Ayala Ramírez (2020-

Other priests of this diocese who became bishops
José Léon Rojas Chaparro, appointed Coadjutor Bishop of Trujillo in 1961
José Hernán Sánchez Porras, appointed Bishop of Venezuela, Military in 2000
Jorge Anibal Quintero Chacón, appointed Bishop of Margarita in 2008
Francisco Gerardo Escalante Molina, appointed nuncio and titular Archbishop in 2016

See also
Roman Catholicism in Venezuela

Sources
 GCatholic.org
 Catholic Hierarchy 

Roman Catholic dioceses in Venezuela
Roman Catholic Ecclesiastical Province of Mérida in Venezuela
Christian organizations established in 1922
Roman Catholic dioceses and prelatures established in the 20th century
1922 establishments in Venezuela
San Cristóbal, Táchira